Northfield Township may refer to:

 Northfield Township, Cook County, Illinois
 Northfield Township, Michigan
 Northfield Township, Rice County, Minnesota
 Northfield Township, Ramsey County, North Dakota, in Ramsey County, North Dakota

Township name disambiguation pages